La Jagua Airport  is an airport serving the town of Garzón, in the Huila Department of Colombia.

See also

Transport in Colombia
List of airports in Colombia

References

External links
OpenStreetMap - La Jagua
OurAirports - La Jagua
FallingRain - La Jagua
Google Maps - La Jagua

Airports in Colombia